Eldis Kraja (born 22 March 2000) is an Albanian footballer who plays as a left winger for Međimurje, moving there from Anagennisi Deryneia in the Cypriot Second Division.

Career

Tirana
After moving from Salernitana youth  in the summer of 2019, Kraja made his league debut for Tirana on 26 January 2020, coming on as an 80th minute substitute for Jurgen Çelhaka in a 5-1 victory over Luftëtari.

References

Honours
Tirana
 Albanian Superliga: 2019–20

External links
Eldis Kraja at Football Database

2000 births
Living people
Footballers from Shkodër
Association football midfielders
Albanian footballers
Albania youth international footballers
Albania under-21 international footballers
KF Tirana players
NK Međimurje players
Kategoria Superiore players
First Football League (Croatia) players
Albanian expatriate footballers
Expatriate footballers in Cyprus
Albanian expatriate sportspeople in Cyprus
Expatriate footballers in Croatia
Albanian expatriate sportspeople in Croatia